Worldradio was a monthly amateur radio enthusiast magazine published in Sacramento, CA, United States from July 1971 to January 2009. The magazine was published in English and drew its subscription base primarily from the America and Canada, although it had subscribers around the world. The staff of the magazine had an Amateur Radio club that was assigned the call sign WR6WR. This magazine is unrelated to a magazine called "World-Radio" published in the United Kingdom before World War II.

Sale to CQ Communications, Inc. 
On November 12, 2008, CQ Communications, publishers of CQ Amateur Radio, CQ VHF Magazine and Popular Communications announced that they had purchased Worldradio magazine from the founder and publisher Armond Noble, N6WR. Paid subscriptions for Worldradio were turned into CQ Amateur Radio subscriptions, while WorldRadio was continued as an on-line magazine. The first online issue, renamed WorldRadio Online, was published in February 2009.

References

External links
 WorldRadio magazine

1971 establishments in North Carolina
2008 disestablishments in North Carolina
Amateur radio magazines
Hobby magazines published in the United States
Monthly magazines published in the United States
Defunct magazines published in the United States
Magazines established in 1971
Magazines disestablished in 2008
Magazines published in North Carolina
Mass media in Asheville, North Carolina